Charles M. "Buck" Wharton (1868 – November 14, 1949) was an American football player.  He was selected as an All-American guard in 1896 while playing for the University of Pennsylvania. The Penn teams of 1894 and 1895, with Wharton and fellow Hall of Fame inductee, Charlie Gelbert, as the guards were undefeated both years and won back-to-back national championships. In the College Football Hall of Fame biography of Wharton, the 6-foot, 3-inch guard was called "a blocking dynamo, often taking out entire sides of an enemy line in the style of an axe-swinging Paul Bunyan." Wharton served as state senator in Delaware from 1914 to 1917.  Buck also served as Penn's director of field athletics and line coach. In 1963, he was posthumously inducted into the College Football Hall of Fame.

References

External links
 
 

1868 births
1949 deaths
19th-century players of American football
American football guards
Penn Quakers football coaches
Penn Quakers football players
All-American college football players
College Football Hall of Fame inductees
People from Smyrna, Delaware
Coaches of American football from Delaware
Players of American football from Delaware